Sturgeon River is a  river in the U.S. state of Michigan, flowing mostly southward through Alger County and Delta County counties on the Upper Peninsula.

A post office named Sturgeon River opened near the mouth of the river on July 23, 1891. The name was changed to St. Jacques on June 22, 1904. It closed on November 30, 1913, re-opened April 11, 1919, and was discontinued on July 31, 1955.

Tributaries 
(from the mouth)
 (right) Bull Run
 Moss Lake
 Germaine Creek
 (left) Morman Creek
 (left) Moses Creek
 (right) Eighteenmile Creek
 (left) Johnson Creek
 Kenobo Lake
 (right) Mink Creek
 Cache Lake
 (right) Chicago Lake
 Vista Lake
 Back Lake
 (left) Little Black Creek
 (left) Black Creek
 (left) West Branch Sturgeon River
 West Branch Lake
 Round Lake
 Lake Stella
 (right) Camp R Creek
 Dam Lake
 (left) Little Aleck Lake
 (right) Wheelbarrow Lake
 Lake Twenty Five
 (left) Little Round Lake
 Sixteenmile Lake

References 

Rivers of Michigan
Rivers of Alger County, Michigan
Rivers of Delta County, Michigan
Tributaries of Lake Michigan
Wild and Scenic Rivers of the United States